Beane may refer to:

Beane (surname)
Beane (singer), a contestant in season 19 of American Idol 
Beane, Hertfordshire, a hamlet in Hertfordshire, England
River Beane, a river in Hertfordshire, England

See also
Bean (disambiguation)